Australia has submitted films for the Academy Award for Best International Feature Film since 1996. The award is handed out annually by the United States Academy of Motion Picture Arts and Sciences to a feature-length motion picture produced outside the United States that contains primarily non-English dialogue. , fifteen Australian films have been submitted for the Academy Award for Best Foreign Language Film, and one, Tanna, has been nominated for the award. The Australian submission is selected by a committee of Australian industry professionals convened and selected by Screen Australia.

Submissions
The Academy of Motion Picture Arts and Sciences has invited the film industries of various countries to submit their best film for the Academy Award for Best Foreign Language Film since 1956. The Foreign Language Film Award Committee oversees the process and reviews all the submitted films. Following this, they vote via secret ballot to determine the five nominees for the award. Below is a list of the films that have been submitted by Australia for review by the Academy for the award by year and the respective Academy Awards ceremony.

As a majority-English-speaking country, Australia only infrequently sends non-English language movies to the Oscars. Three of their first five submissions were stories of the lives of immigrants to Australia. Australia's first submission, Floating Life is a drama about Cantonese immigrants from Hong Kong who reunite with their daughter who moved to Australia several years before. The second submission, La Spagnola is a black comedy about a pregnant Spanish immigrant who is deserted by her husband after arriving in Australia. A subsequent submission, The Home Song Stories is about a Chinese woman from Shanghai who moves to Australia with her two children after marrying an Australian citizen. Both principal actors, Clara Law and Tony Ayres, were born in Macau and became naturalized Australian citizens.

Australia's 2006, 2009 and 2014 submissions were Aboriginal Australian stories. Ten Canoes was the first feature film made primarily in one of Australia's Aboriginal languages. The film, set before the arrival of white Australian settlers, tells a story within a story, about what happens when a young man falls for one of the brides of the local chief. Samson & Delilah, the first Australian film to make an Oscar shortlist, won the Camera d'Or at Cannes in 2009, and focused on a teenaged Aboriginal couple on the run.

See also
List of Academy Award winners and nominees for Best Foreign Language Film
List of Academy Award-winning foreign language films
List of Australian Academy Award winners and nominees
Cinema of Australia

Notes

References

External links
The Official Academy Awards Database
The Motion Picture Credits Database
IMDb Academy Awards Page

Australia